Taavi is an Estonian and Finnish masculine given name, a version of David.

People named Taavi include:
Taavi Aas (born 1966), Estonian politician, Mayor of Tallinn since 2017
Taavi Eelmaa (born 1971), Estonian actor
Taavi (Dave) Komonen (1898–1978), Finnish-Canadian long-distance runner
Taavi Kotka (born 1979), Estonian businessman
Taavi Peetre (1983–2010), Estonian shot putter
Taavi Pöyhönen (1882–1961), Finnish politician
Taavi Rähn (born 1981), Estonian football player
Taavi Rand (born 1992), Estonian ice dancer
Taavi Rõivas (born 1979), former Prime Minister of Estonia
Taavi Aulis Rytkönen (born 1929), Finnish football player
Taavi Tainio (1874–1929), Finnish journalist and politician 
Taavi Tamminen (1889–1967), Finnish wrestler
Taavi Teplenkov (born 1975), Estonian actor
Taavi Toom (born 1970), Estonian diplomat
Taavi Varm (born 1979), Estonian artist
Taavi Vartia (born 1965), Finnish film director
Taavi Vartiainen (born 1994), Finnish ice hockey player
Taavi Veskimägi (born 1974), Estonian politician

References

Estonian masculine given names
Finnish masculine given names